Cyril Carrillo (born 1 September 1990) is a French motorcycle racer who has competed in the 125cc World Championship, the Red Bull MotoGP Rookies Cup and the European Superstock 600 Championship. He won the French 125 Championship in 2009.

Career statistics

Grand Prix motorcycle racing

By season

Races by year
(key)

References

External links
 Profile on MotoGP.com
 Profile on WorldSBK.com

1990 births
Living people
French motorcycle racers
125cc World Championship riders